Anders Hejlsberg (born 2 December 1960) is a Danish software engineer who co-designed several programming languages and development tools. He was the original author of Turbo Pascal and the chief architect of Delphi. He currently works for Microsoft as the lead architect of C# and core developer on TypeScript.

Early life 
Hejlsberg was born in Copenhagen, Denmark, and studied Electrical Engineering at the Technical University of Denmark. While at the university in 1980, he began writing programs for the Nascom microcomputer, including a Pascal compiler which was initially marketed as the Blue Label Software Pascal for the Nascom-2. However, he soon rewrote it for CP/M and DOS, marketing it first as Compas Pascal and later as PolyPascal. Later the product was licensed to Borland, and integrated into an IDE to become the Turbo Pascal system. Turbo Pascal competed with PolyPascal. The compiler itself was largely inspired by the "Tiny Pascal" compiler in Niklaus Wirth's "Algorithms + Data Structures = Programs", one of the most influential computer science books of the time.

At Borland 
In Borland's hands, Turbo Pascal became one of the most commercially successful Pascal compilers. Hejlsberg remained with PolyData until the company came under financial stress and in 1989 he moved to California to become Chief Engineer at Borland. During this time he developed Turbo Pascal further and became the chief architect for the team that produced Borland Delphi, which replaced Turbo Pascal.

At Microsoft 

In 1996, Hejlsberg left Borland and joined Microsoft. One of his first achievements was the J++ programming language and the Windows Foundation Classes; he also became a Microsoft Distinguished Engineer and Technical Fellow. Since 2000, he has been the lead architect of the team developing the C# language. In 2012 Hejlsberg announced a new Microsoft project, TypeScript, a superset of JavaScript.

Awards 
Hejlsberg received the 2001 Dr. Dobb's Excellence in Programming Award for his work on Turbo Pascal, Delphi, C# and the Microsoft .NET Framework.

Together with Shon Katzenberger, Scott Wiltamuth, Todd Proebsting, Erik Meijer, Peter Hallam, and Peter Sollich, Anders was awarded a Technical Recognition Award for Outstanding Technical Achievement for their work on the C# language in 2007.

See also
 Timeline of programming languages
 C# programming language

References

Bibliography

Published works 
 The C# Programming Language, 2nd edition, Addison-Wesley Professional, 2006-06-09
 The C# Programming Language, 3rd edition, Addison-Wesley Professional, 2008-10-18
 The C# Programming Language, 4th edition, Addison-Wesley Professional, October 2010

External links 
Microsoft doubled the bonus to  after Borland made a counter-offer. Hejlsberg left Borland in October 1996.
 The C# Design Process
 The Trouble with Checked Exceptions
 Delegates, Components and Simplexity
 Versioning, Virtual and Override
 Contracts and Interoperability
 Inappropriate Abstractions
 Generics in C#, Java and C++
 CLR Design Choices
 Microsoft's Hejlsberg touts .NET, C-Omega (now LINQ) technologies
 Deep Inside C#: An Interview with Microsoft Chief Architect Anders Hejlsberg
 C#: Yesterday, Today, and Tomorrow
 Video interview at channel9
 Computerworld Interview with Anders on C#

Videos 
 Anders Hejlsberg - Introducing TypeScript
 Life and Times of Anders Hejlsberg
 Anders Hejlsberg - Tour through computing industry history at the Microsoft Museum
 Anders Hejlsberg - What's so great about generics?
 Anders Hejlsberg - Programming data in C# 3.0
 Anders Hejlsberg - What brought about the birth of the CLR
 Anders Hejlsberg - The .NET Show: The .NET Framework
 Anders Hejlsberg - The .NET Show: Programming in C#
 Anders Hejlsberg - More C# Talk from C#'s Architect (Happy Birthday Video #3)
 Anders Hejlsberg - LINQ
 Anders Hejlsberg - Whiteboard with Anders Hejlsberg
 Anders Hejlsberg - LINQ and Functional Programming
 Outstanding Technical Achievement: C# Team
 Anders Hejlsberg - The Future of C#
 Anders Hejlsberg - The future of programming languages (JAOO Aarhus 2008)
 The Future of C# and Visual Basic (PDC 2010)
 'Look Back' on C# (Microsoft Build 2019)

Danish computer scientists
Danish computer programmers
Microsoft technical fellows
Microsoft employees
Borland employees
Living people
Programming language designers
1960 births
Industry and corporate fellows